Princesses: Long Island is an American reality television series on Bravo that premiered on June 2, 2013. The series later was canceled after airing only one season.

Synopsis
Princesses: Long Island chronicles six young Jewish American Princesses from the boomerang generation who reside at home with their parents in various communities on Long Island. It follows the group as they go out on the social scene, look for their future husbands, as well as drama within the group. Cast member Chanel "Coco" Omari says in the premiere episode that "when you are Jewish, live on Long Island, are 27, and are still living at home, it's time to panic."

Cast

 Amanda Bertoncini — Age 27: Resides in Great Neck
 Ashlee White — Age 30: Resides in Roslyn
 Casey Cohen — Age 28: Resides part-time in Jericho, part-time in Manhattan
 Chanel "Coco" Omari — Age 28: Resides in Great Neck
 Erica Gimbel — Age 29: Resides in Old Westbury
 Joey Lauren — Age 30: Resides in Freeport

Episodes

Reception
"As horrifying as it is in most ways, Princesses is actually obsessively watchable", The A.V. Clubs Eric Thurm wrote: "As someone who has in fact been described as a Nice Jewish Boy, it’s easy for me to find most of the princess’ attempts at Judaism funny. I’ll admit, I know a few people from the area who are in fact worse than any of the princesses". Thurm concluded that "Princesses is probably a 'B' for entertainment value but a 'D' for how appalling it is".

Religion News Service's Corrie Mitchell cited rabbis and other Jews, including Representative Steve Israel (D-NY), who denounced the show for allegedly promoting anti-Semitic stereotypes of Jews. Lilit Marcus of The Jewish Forward wrote that "Anti-Semitism existed long before reality TV ever did, and it will probably continue existing when reality TV is a relic of history ... Italian-Americans survived Jersey Shore. African-Americans survived The Real Housewives of Atlanta. Vapid pharmaceutical sales reps survived The Bachelor. We’re going to be just fine".

References

External links 

 
 
 

2010s American reality television series
2013 American television series debuts
2013 American television series endings
Bravo (American TV network) original programming
English-language television shows
Jewish mass media in the United States
Television series about Jews and Judaism
Television shows set in New York (state)
American Jews
Long Island
Judaism in New York City
Women in New York City